Langevin may refer to:
 Langevin (surname)
 5290 Langevin, an asteroid
 Langevin (crater) on the Moon

See also 
 Institut Laue–Langevin, scientific facility in Grenoble, France
 Office of the Prime Minister and Privy Council, a government office building in Ottawa, Canada formerly called Langevin Block
 Physics and mathematics (named for Paul Langevin):
 Langevin's function (and its relation to Brillouin's)
 Langevin dynamics
 Langevin equation